Lions Head Mountain is a  mountain summit located in the Boundary Ranges of the Coast Mountains, in the U.S. state of Alaska. Although modest in elevation, relief is significant since Lions Head Mountain rises 5,400 feet above the Berners River Valley in less than three miles. The peak's descriptive name was applied in 1867 by George Davidson, geographer with the U.S. Coast and Geodetic Survey, because its serrated profile resembles a lion couchant. This name was published in the 1869 Coast Pilot, and officially adopted in 1929 by the U.S. Board on Geographic Names.

Climate

Based on the Köppen climate classification, Lions Head Mountain has a subarctic climate with cold, snowy winters, and cool summers. Weather systems coming off the Gulf of Alaska are forced upwards by the Coast Mountains (orographic lift), causing heavy precipitation in the form of rainfall and snowfall. Temperatures can drop below −20 °C with wind chill factors below −30 °C. This climate supports glaciers on the north side of this mountain. The months May through July offer the most favorable weather for viewing or climbing Lions Head Mountain.

See also

List of mountain peaks of Alaska
Geography of Alaska

References

External links
 Lions Head Mountain: weather forecast
 Photo of Phoebe, Lions Head Mountain, and Alaska Marine Highway System ferry 

Mountains of Alaska
Mountains of Juneau, Alaska
Boundary Ranges
North American 1000 m summits